Lisa Carol Rhoades (born 13 February 1963 in Kansas) is an American poet.

Biography
Rhoades received her B.A. from Louisiana State University and her M.F.A. from Columbia University. Prior to receiving her nursing degree from New York University, Rhoades was a production editor at the Institute of International Education.

She has also taught workshops in poetry.

Rhoades is the daughter of John D. Rhoades, a retired dean of veterinary medicine at L.S.U., and Carol Rhoades.  She is married to David Nygard and lives with her husband and children in New York City.

Bibliography

Books and chapbooks
 Strange Gravity. Treadwell, NY: Bright Hill Press, 2004.

Broadsides
 "The Week I Thought I Was." Winona, MN: Sutton Hoo Press, 2001.

Journals
 Richard Jones, ed. Poetry East #33. DePaul University, 1992. ASIN B000M7J89U
 "Ugly", "Wrecked", "The New Jersey Girls Are Fixing Their Hair" and "The Week I Thought I Was", Poetry, May 2002.
 “Poppy,” Barrow Street. Winter 2017/18. Print. 95. 
 “The Long Grass,” Smartish Pace. Forthcoming, March 2018. Printb 
 “The Heart Saying It’s OK,”Beech Street Review. January 4, 2018. Web.
 “The Words at Hand,” Sweet: A Literary Confection.  Vol. 10, No. 1. September2017, sweetlit.wordpress.com. 
 “No,” Literary Mama. April, 2017. Web.
 “It Depends,” New Ohio Review. Fall, 2017. Print
 “Errand,” The Same. Vol 10, No. 4. Summer/Fall 2012. Print.
 “Yard Sonnet,” Big City Lit. Spring 2011. Web 
 “Mourning Song,” Big City Lit. Spring 2011. Web

References

1963 births
Living people
People from Kansas
Louisiana State University alumni
Columbia University School of the Arts alumni
New York University alumni
American poets
American women poets
21st-century American women